NASCAR on TNN was the name of a television program that broadcast NASCAR races on The Nashville Network (now Paramount Network).

History
TNN started showing races live in 1991, but it had aired taped coverage of a few Winston Cup races in the 1980s on its American Sports Cavalcade program.

TNN had a self-operating and self-promoting sub-division called TNN Motor Sports, and aired races produced by that division from 1991 to 2000. Under the TNN Motor Sports umbrella, NASCAR series races (including those of the then-Winston Cup Series and Busch Grand National Series, as well as the Craftsman Truck Series) were the most prominently featured, but races of smaller circuits such as the International Motor Sports Association IMSA Sports Car Series, ASA, USAC, the NHRA, and ARCA were also showcased, as was motorcycle and speedboat racing.

In 1995, the motorsports operations were moved into the industrial park located at Charlotte Motor Speedway in Concord, North Carolina, where TNN had purchased controlling interest in World Sports Enterprises, a motorsports production company.

Also by 1995, Westinghouse Electric Corporation, who at the time owned the CBS networks and had an existing relationship with TNN through its Group W division, purchased TNN and its sister network CMT outright to form CBS Cable, along with a short-lived startup network entitled Eye On People (now Investigation Discovery). TNN's ties to CBS allowed it to carry CBS Sports' run overs, which happened during a NASCAR Busch Series race at Texas Motor Speedway in 1999. The network however was a center of controversy for not airing the following year's Busch Series race at the same track after the initial broadcast on CBS rained out, instead showing Tom Sawyer instead.

Races aired
TNN picked up several of the "second tier" Winston Cup races of the time, whose rights packages were allowed to expire by ESPN. Races at tracks such as Rockingham, Dover, Pocono, Loudon, and Phoenix, were among the events signed.

In general, ESPN abandoned slower, longer, races. 500-mile races at Rockingham, Dover and Pocono were known to last upwards of five hours, requiring a broadcast window as long as six hours to include pre-race and post-race coverage. While the growing ESPN network did not want to dedicate such large windows to what were regarded as second-tier races, TNN's relatively open schedule for Sunday afternoons allowed for the large broadcast windows that these races required. The races at Rockingham and Dover were shortened to 400 miles in 1995 and 1997, respectively, but remained part of the TNN lineup. 

TNN began airing NASCAR’s all-star race, then known as The Winston, when it was moved to prime time in 1992. This meant that, at its peak, TNN was home to eight Cup Series broadcasts per season, a quarter of the schedule; this consisted of both races at Rockingham, Dover, and Loudon, Phoenix's lone race, and the June race at Pocono (TBS aired the July race).

In 1998, TNN acquired the one-time rights (from CBS) of the Pepsi 400, the first race at Daytona run at night. Due to Florida wildfires, the race was postponed from July 4 to October. Because of the postponement, CBS, which originally held the rights to the race, declined to cover the October race because of pre-existing coverage agreements, and not wanting to go head-to-head with Game 1 of the World Series on Fox. TNN stepped in and as a result, covered the first race at Daytona held under the lights.

The Winter Heat Series meanwhile, aired during the winter months between November and January (during NASCAR's offseason). The program began during the 1994-1995 winter and ran through the 1998-1999 winter. The races were held at the 3/8 mile Tucson Raceway Park in Tucson, Arizona. TNN originally broadcast the races before ESPN took over.

TNN also provided coverage for many Busch Series races from 1991-2000.  The network covered events at smaller facilities such as Lanier, South Boston, Myrtle Beach, and Hickory.  Similarly, the network broadcast Craftsman Truck Series events at Topeka, Flemington, Odessa, and Nashville.

Broadcast team
Mike Joy, a pit reporter for CBS at the time, was the lead commentator for TNN’s initial years from 1991 to 1995; when he moved to become the lead commentator at CBS, he was replaced by Eli Gold in 1996.  When Gold was unavailable due to scheduling conflicts with his role as radio play-by-play man for the University of Alabama, particularly for Busch Series races in the autumn, RaceDay host Rick Benjamin often filled in.

One constant presence in the TNN broadcast booth was analyst Buddy Baker. Baker worked for the network for all 10 seasons it covered Winston Cup and Busch Series action.  Over the course of its decade covering the sport, TNN also utilized other analysts such as Neil Bonnett and Dick Berggren, as well as pit reporters Glenn Jarrett, who like Baker worked for TNN the entire decade, Steve Evans, Brock Yates, Randy Pemberton, and Ralph Sheheen.  

Bonnett was TNN's lead analyst from 1991-93 and hosted the racing highlight show Winners for the network until his tragic death in a practice crash prior to the 1994 Daytona 500.  

In addition to its regular analysts, TNN provided the launching pad for future broadcast mainstays Darrell Waltrip, Larry McReynolds, and Phil Parsons.  Waltrip, who remained an active Cup Series driver on Sundays until 2000, cut his teeth as a broadcaster by serving as an analyst for Saturday Busch Series telecasts on TNN starting in 1994.  Likewise, McReynolds provided commentary for select Busch Series and Craftsman Truck Series races that did not conflict with his crew chief duties for the Winston Cup Series on Sundays.  Parsons was the sole analyst for the network's first Winston Cup event in 1991 and would later return for sporadic appearances throughout the remainder of the decade.

TNN also featured a few pit reporters that went on to find success at other networks in the future, such as future ESPN pit reporter and NBC lead commentator Bill Weber, future Fox, NBC, and TNT pit reporter Matt Yocum, ACC sports mainstay Mike Hogewood, and pit reporter Steve Byrnes, who hosted several NASCAR-related programs for Fox and Speed.

For the Busch Series race at Memphis in 2001, there was a mini-TNN reunion as Gold and Jarrett called the race for NBC, with Sheheen in the pits. The race had been postponed a day by rain and thus the normal NBC broadcast team of Allen Bestwick, Benny Parsons, and Wally Dallenbach was unavailable to call the event; they were in Martinsville to call the Old Dominion 500 which was also affected by the rain and postponed.

TNN loses NASCAR (2000)
NASCAR wanted to capitalize on its increased popularity at the start of the 21st century, so the organization decided that future television deals would be centralized; that is, the networks would negotiate with NASCAR directly for a regular schedule of telecasts, as opposed to negotiating with each individual race track. With many tracks now falling under the ownership of either the France-family led International Speedway Corporation or the Bruton Smith led Speedway Motorsports, it was much easier for consolidated television packages to be negotiated.  NASCAR wanted to increase the number of races by each partner, and have as many races on broadcast networks as possible, to prevent fans from missing races.

During the final season of the old broadcast arrangement in 2000, NASCAR had races on CBS, TNN, ESPN, ABC, NBC and TBS.  ESPN and its parent network ABC broadcast the most races during the 2000 season (18).  TNN had the second most (8, plus The Winston All-Star Race), followed by CBS (4, plus the Busch Clash and 125-mile qualifying races for the Daytona 500), TBS (3), and NBC (1).

The first consolidated TV deal was struck on December 15, 1999. 

Under the new deal, Fox Sports, FX, NBC and TBS (later moved to TNT) agreed to pay $2.4 billion for a new six-year package, covering the Winston Cup (now NASCAR Cup) Series and Busch (now Xfinity) Series schedules.
 Fox and FX would televise the first 16 races of the 2001, 2003 and 2005 seasons and races 2 through 17 of the 2002, 2004 and 2006 seasons. Fox would air the Daytona 500 in the odd-numbered years. All Busch Series races during that part of the season would also be on Fox/FX.
 NBC and TNT would televise the final 17 races of the even-numbered years as well as the Daytona 500 and the last 18 races of the odd-numbered years, as well as all Busch Series races held in that time of the year.

With its limited reach in terms of viewers, and with changes being made to the network itself in order to attract younger viewers, TNN couldn't provide the platform or scope that NASCAR wanted for its future television partners. As a result, after nearly 10 years of live coverage, as well as tape delayed coverage on American Sports Cavalcade in the 1980s, TNN's partnership with NASCAR came to a close at the conclusion of the 2000 NASCAR Winston Cup Series season.  The network's final broadcast was the Checker Auto Parts/Dura Lube 500 on November 5. TNN's final NASCAR broadcast as The Nashville Network was the 2000 MBNA.com 400 on September 24. It became The National Network the next day, and on the last couple of TNN races, the new logo was in the top right corner, instead of the transparent Nashville Network logo.

Commentators
Notable TNN racing personalities included Ken Squier, Mike Joy, Steve Evans, Eli Gold, Buddy Baker, Neil Bonnett, Randy Pemberton, Brock Yates, Glenn Jarrett, Mike Hogewood, Steve Byrnes, Ralph Sheheen, Dick Berggren, Larry McReynolds, Darrell Waltrip, Chad Little, Mark Allen, Mark Garrow and Rick Benjamin.

References

External links

TNN
1990s American television series
The Nashville Network original programming
1983 American television series debuts
2000 American television series endings